The higher education bubble in the United States is the concern that excessive investment in higher education could have negative repercussions in the broader economy. Although college tuition payments are rising, the supply of college graduates in many fields of study is exceeding the demand for their skills, which aggravates graduate unemployment and underemployment while increasing the burden of student loan defaults on financial institutions and taxpayers. The claim has generally been used to justify cuts to public higher education spending, tax cuts, or a shift of government spending towards law enforcement and national security. There is a further concern that having an excess supply of college graduates exacerbates political instability, historically linked to having a bulge in the number of young degree holders.

Some economists reject the notion of a higher education bubble, noting that the returns on higher education vastly outweigh the cost, while others believe that the number of institutions of higher education in the United States will fall in the 2020s and beyond, citing reasons of demographic decline, poor outcomes, economic problems, and changing public interests and attitudes. According to the U.S. Department of Education, by the late 2010s, people with technical or vocational trainings are slightly more likely to be employed than those with a bachelor's degree and significantly more likely to be employed in their fields of specialty. The United States currently suffers from a shortage of skilled tradespeople. The Federal Reserve Bank of St. Louis noted in 2019 that investment in higher education has reached a point of diminishing marginal returns; undergraduate and graduate enrollments have both been in decline. Many faculty members are leaving academia, especially those from the humanities. At the same time, university graduates are likely to regret having studied the humanities and liberal arts.

Discussion 
As of the early 2010s, whether or not the "higher-education bubble" exists was debated among economists. Data shows that the wage premium, the difference in incomes between those with a four-year college degree and those with only a high school diploma, has increased dramatically since the 1970s, but so has the 'debt load' incurred by students due to the tuition inflation. In 1971, Time ran the article "Education: Graduates and Jobs: A Grave New World" which stated that the supply of PhD students was 30 to 50 percent larger than the expected future demand in upcoming decades. In 1987, U.S. Secretary of Education William Bennett suggested that the availability of loans may be fueling an increase in tuition prices and an education bubble. This "Bennett hypothesis" claims that readily available loans allow schools to increase tuition without regard to demand elasticity. Over the past thirty years, demand has increased as institutions improved facilities and provided more resources to students. Glenn Reynolds argued in his book, The Higher Education Bubble (2012), that higher education as a "product grows more and more elaborate—and more expensive—but the expense is offset by cheap credit provided by sellers who are eager to encourage buyers to buy." A 2011 study from the Labor Department found that a bachelor's degree "represents a significant advantage in the job market." In 2011, The Chronicle of Higher Education ran an article saying that the future is bright for college graduates. The data also suggests that, notwithstanding a slight increase in 2008–09, student loan default rates have declined between the mid-1980s and 1990s and early 2010s. The management consulting firm McKinsey & Company projected in 2011 that a shortage of college-educated workers and a surplus of workers without college degrees, which would cause the wage premium to increase and cause differences in unemployment rates to become even more dramatic.
However, research from the Center for Household Financial Stability of the Federal Reserve Bank of St. Louis presented in 2018 predicts a declining but still positive income premium for completing college but a declining wealth premium, which is almost indistinguishable from zero for the most recent cohort. Those with college degrees are much less likely than those without to be unemployed, even though they are more expensive to employ (they earn higher wages). 

An alternative proposal suggests that there is no general bubble in higher education because, on average, higher education really does boost income and employment by more than enough to make it a good investment, but that degrees in some specific fields may be overvalued because they do little to boost income or improve job prospects, and degrees in other fields may in fact be undervalued because students do not appreciate the extent to which these degrees could benefit their employment prospects and future income. Proponents of this hypothesis have noted that schools charge equal prices for tuition regardless of what students study, but the interest rate on federal student loans is not adjusted according to risk, and there is evidence that undergraduate students in their first three years of college are not very good at predicting future wages by major. Among graduates of the early 2020s, the most regretted majors are journalism, sociology, liberal arts/general studies, communications, and education; the least regretted majors are computer science and information technology, criminology, engineering, nursing, and health. At the same time, graduates with the highest expected income studied chemical engineering, aerospace engineering, chemistry, economics, and the life sciences.
Due to popular demand, the cost of higher education has grown at a rate faster than inflation between the late 20th and early 21st centuries. The 2010s were a turbulent period for higher education in the United States, as small private colleges from across the country face deep financial trouble due to higher tuition discounts in order to attract students at a time of expensive higher education costs, tougher regulation, and the fact that the college-aged population in many regions has declined. A 2019 analysis by Moody's Investor Services estimated that about 20% of all small private liberal arts colleges in the United States were in serious financial trouble. Between the early 2000s and early 2020s, hundreds of institutions permanently closed their doors. Extant institutions struggle to survive by dropping programs with low student interest, including many in the liberal arts and the humanities, like gender studies and critical race theory, creating majors for emerging fields, such as artificial intelligence, and professional programs, like law enforcement, and investing in online learning programs. 

The arrival of COVID-19 in the United States in 2020 merely accelerated the process. The novel coronavirus not only wrought havoc on the nation but also caused a severe economic downturn. Consequently, families chose to either delay or avoid sending their children to institutions of higher education altogether. Undergraduate enrollments dropped even after the return of in-person classes. Worse still for colleges and universities, they have become dependent on foreign students for revenue because they pay full tuition fees and the international restrictions imposed to alleviate the spread of the pandemic mean that this stream of revenue will shrink substantially. Several permanently closed their doors by the end of the 2019–20 academic year. Numerous institutions, including elite ones, have suspended graduate programs in the humanities and liberal arts due to low student interest and dim employment prospects. Various polls indicate that growing numbers of Americans have become skeptical of the value of higher education relative to the cost and would like to see K-12 education being less focused on college preparation. Having witnessed the Millennials accumulating large amounts of student debts, members of Generation Z tend to be more skeptical of the value of higher education and more open to alternative educational routes and career options. Young men, especially whites, are increasingly looking elsewhere due to the hostility of identity politics on campus towards them, viewing them as a "privileged" group. Meanwhile, the number of women's colleges continues to fall, following a decades-long trend. Some employers are now hiring fresh graduates from high school, offering them generous bonuses, high wages, and apprenticeship programs in order to offset the ongoing labor shortage. In 2022, the Joe Biden administration announced an initiative aimed at expanding apprenticeship and work-based training programs in K-12 public schools in order to create a competitive and skilled workforce.

In 2019, a report from the Federal Reserve Bank of St. Louis using data from the 2016 Survey of Consumer Finances demonstrated that after controlling for race and age cohort, families with heads of household with post-secondary education who were born before 1980 have benefited from wealth and income premiums, while for families with heads of household with post-secondary education but born after 1980 the wealth premium has weakened to point of statistical insignificance (in part because of the rising cost of college). Moreover, although the income premium remains positive, it has declined to historic lows (with more pronounced downward trajectories with heads of household with postgraduate degrees).

In the aftermath of the COVID-19 pandemic, colleges and universities saw an increase in the number of faculty members leaving academia, citing low pay, stressful work environments, heavy workloads, lack of administrative support, and occupational burnout. Moreover, lecturers and professors in the humanities face a highly precarious job market. Graduates who majored in the humanities and the liberal arts in the 2010s were most likely to regret having done so and had lower expected incomes than their counterparts in STEM.

Between the early 2000s and the late 2010s, the number of students from emerging economies going abroad for higher education increased, and the United States was the most popular destination for international students, many of whom were from mainland China. However, deteriorating Sino-American relations and the COVID-19 pandemic reduced the number of Chinese students enrolling in many U.S. colleges and universities.

Controversy 

The view that higher education is a bubble is debated. Some economists do not think that returns to a college education are falling but instead believe that the benefits far outweigh the costs. Yet, the returns for marginal students or students in certain majors, especially at costly private universities, may not justify the investment. It has been suggested that the returns to education should be compared to the returns to other forms of investment such as the stock market, bonds, real estate, and private equity. A higher return would suggest underinvestment in higher education, but lower returns would suggest a bubble. Studies have typically found a causal relationship between growth and education, although the quality and type of education matters, and not just the number of years of schooling.

In a financial bubble, assets like houses are sometimes purchased with a view to reselling at a higher price, and this can produce rapidly escalating prices as people speculate on future prices. An end to the spiral can provoke abrupt selling of the assets, resulting in an abrupt collapse in price the bursting of the bubble. Because the asset acquired through college attendance a higher education cannot be sold but only rented through wages, there is no similar mechanism that would cause an abrupt collapse in the value of existing degrees. For this reason, this analogy could be misleading. However, one rebuttal to the claims that a bubble analogy is misleading is the observation that the 'bursting' of the bubble are the negative effects on students who incur student debt, for example, as the American Association of State Colleges and Universities reports that "Students are deeper in debt today than ever before.... The trend of heavy debt burdens threatens to limit access to higher education, particularly for low-income and first-generation students, who tend to carry the heaviest debt burden. Federal student aid policy has steadily put resources into student loan programs rather than need-based grants, a trend that straps future generations with high debt burdens. Even students who receive federal grant aid are finding it more difficult to pay for college."

However, the data actually show that notwithstanding a slight increase in 2008–2009, student loan default rates have declined since the mid-1980s and 1990s. During both periods of growth and recession, those with college degrees are much less likely than those without to be unemployed, even though they earn higher wages.

Ohio University economist Richard Vedder has written in The Wall Street Journal that:

Alternatives to bubble hypothesis 
A different explanation for rising tuition is the reduction of state and federal appropriations to colleges, making them more reliant on student tuition. Thus, it is not a bubble but a form of shifting costs away from state and federal funding over to students. This has mostly applied to public universities which in 2011 for the first time have taken in more in tuition than in state funding and had the greatest increases in tuition. Implied from this shift away from public funding to tuition is privatization, although The New York Times reported that such claims are exaggerated.

A second hypothesis claims that as a result of federal law that severely restricts the ability of students to discharge their federally guaranteed student loans in bankruptcy, lenders and colleges know that students are on the hook for any amount that they borrow, including late fees and interest (which can be capitalized and increase the principal loan amount), thus removing the incentive to only provide students loans that the students can be reasonably expected to repay. As evidence for this hypothesis, it has been suggested that returning bankruptcy protections (and other standard consumer protections) to student loans would cause lenders to be more cautious, thereby causing a sharp decline in the availability of student loans, which, in turn, would decrease the influx of dollars to colleges and universities, who, in turn, would have to sharply decrease tuition to match the lower availability of funds.

Economic and social commentator Gary North has remarked at LewRockwell.com, "To speak of college as a bubble is silly. A bubble does not pop until months or years after the funding ceases. There is no indication that the funding for college education will cease."

Azar Nafisi, Johns Hopkins University professor and bestselling author of Reading Lolita in Tehran, has stated on the PBS NewsHour that a purely economic analysis of a higher education bubble is incomplete:

See also 

 College admissions in the United States
 College tuition in the United States
 Credentialism and educational inflation
 EdFund
 Elite overproduction
 Free education
 Higher Education Price Index
 Higher education in the United States
 Tertiary education
 Private university
 Student debt
 Student loans in the United States
 Tuition payments
 Tuition freeze

References

Further reading
 Angulo, A. (2016). Diploma Mills: How For-profit Colleges Stiffed Students, Taxpayers, and the American Dream. Johns Hopkins University Press.
 Armstrong, E. and Hamilton, L. (2015). Paying for the Party: How College Maintains Inequality. Harvard University Press.
 Bennett, W. and Wilezol, D. (2013). Is College Worth It?: A Former United States Secretary of Education and a Liberal Arts Graduate Expose the Broken Promise of Higher Education. Thomas Nelson.
 Best, J. and Best, E. (2014) The Student Loan Mess: How Good Intentions Created a Trillion-Dollar Problem. Atkinson Family Foundation.
 Caplan, B. (2018). The Case Against Education: Why the Education System Is a Waste of Time and Money. Princeton University Press.
 Cappelli, P. (2015). Will College Pay Off?: A Guide to the Most Important Financial Decision You'll Ever Make. Public Affairs.
 Golden, D. (2006). The Price of Admission: How America’s Ruling Class Buys its Way into Elite Colleges — and Who Gets Left Outside the Gates.
 Goldrick-Rab, S. (2016). Paying the Price: College Costs, Financial Aid, and the Betrayal of the American Dream.
 Reynolds, G. (2012). The Higher Education Bubble. Encounter Books.

External link
 A look at trends in college consolidation since 2016. Higher Ed Dive. Last updated January 18, 2023.

Universities and colleges in the United States
Education finance in the United States
Higher education in the United States
Education economics
Economic bubbles
Education controversies in the United States